The 1994 Royal Liver Assurance UK Championship was a professional ranking snooker tournament that took place at the Guild Hall in Preston, England. The event started on 11 November 1994, and the televised stages were shown on the BBC between 19 and 27 November 1994.

Stephen Hendry won the tournament with record 12 century breaks, beating Ken Doherty 10–5 in the final. During the match Hendry scored seven century breaks; which remains a joint record for a professional match and a standalone record for a best-of-19 match. Hendry also made five centuries in seven frames. Ronnie O'Sullivan was the defending champion, but he lost 7–9 to Doherty in the quarter finals.



Ranking points

Prize fund
The breakdown of prize money for this year is shown below:

Main draw

Final

Century breaks

 139, 106  Ronnie O'Sullivan
 138, 118, 113, 112, 104, 103  Ken Doherty
 135  Dave Harold
 135  Mick Price
 130, 128, 120, 114, 113, 112, 110, 109, 106, 106, 103, 101  Stephen Hendry
 128, 121  Chris Small
 125, 115, 111, 101  Peter Ebdon
 124, 100  Terry Murphy
 119  Alex Higgins
 116, 114, 113, 112, 107  James Wattana
 115  Bradley Jones
 114  Billy Snaddon
 113  Jamie Burnett
 112  Martin Clark
 112  Lee Richardson
 107, 103, 100  Darren Morgan
 107, 100  Matthew Stevens
 107  Joe Swail
 106  John Read
 105, 104  Willie Thorne
 102  Yasin Merchant
 102  Fergal O'Brien

References

1994
UK Championship
UK Championship
UK Championship